Northview High School is a public high school in Johns Creek, Georgia, United States, serving grades 9–12. The school is a part of the Fulton County School System. Its students primarily reside inside the city of Johns Creek, though the school also serves part of Alpharetta. All students from River Trail Middle School feed into Northview.

The school was opened in the fall of 2002 and as of 2019 has an enrollment of around 1,804 students: 75 percent of which are minority students. The student-to-teacher ratio is 18:1. As of 2022, it is by USNews as 252th nationally, 6th in the state of Georgia, and 1st in Fulton County. The school has a 96 percent graduation rate. It is a part of the Fulton County School System.

The school's mascot is the Titan.

Student Data

Demographics
During the 2021-2022 school year, Northview had an enrollment of 1,804 students. The student body was 20.7% White, 57.9% Asian, 5.5% Hispanic, 12.0% Black, 3.9% Multiracial, 0.05% Native American, and 0.0% Pacific Islander.

Academics 
Northview High School boasts an academic program that includes extensive course offerings to prepare a diverse student population for further study after graduation. Approximately one hundred student clubs, service organizations, and academic teams – coupled with a full athletic program and rich arts program – support the Titans’ mission to instill excellence in academics, arts, and athletics.

Northview follows a traditional semester schedule with two 18-week semesters per school year. Each student receives 0.5 units of credit per course at the end of a semester and must carry a full schedule of 6 classes per day.

Northview offers dual enrollment courses with Georgia Tech, Gwinnett Technical College, Kennesaw State University, and Georgia Perimeter College.

Advanced Placement classes include:

 Biology
 Calculus AB
 Calculus BC
 Chemistry
 Chinese Lang/Culture
 College Calculus (via Georgia Tech)
 Computer Science A
 Computer Science Principles
 English Lang/Comp
 English Lit/Comp
 Environmental Science
 European History
 French Lang/Culture
 German Lang/Culture
 US Government/Politics
 Human Geography
 Latin
 Macroeconomics
 Microeconomics
 Music Theory
 Physics 1
 Physics C
 Psychology
 Seminar (for 3DE)
 Spanish Lang/Culture
 Statistics
 Studio Art: 2-D Design
 Studio Art: 3-D Design
 Studio Art: Drawing
 US History
 World History

Northview offers five languages:

 Spanish
 French
 Latin
 Chinese 
 German
Northview offers a wide selection of online classes for world languages, some of which include:

 Latin
 German
 Japanese
 Chinese
 Latin
 French

Northview also has numerous fine arts classes:

 Orchestra
 Has admitted many students to the ASYO
 Midwest Clinic – Orchestra ‘04, ‘10, ‘15, '22
 Band
 Has admitted many students to the ASYO and AYWS
 Chorus
 Art (including Photography, Pottery, Painting, etc.)
 Music Appreciation
 Theater
 Drama

Athletics
Northview competes in Region 5-AAAAA.

Northview's sports include football, basketball, baseball, soccer, softball, tennis, lacrosse, volleyball, track, cross country, wrestling, swimming and diving, and golf.

Since 2010, Northview has hosted the playoffs of the Southeastern Lacrosse Conference.

State championships

As of the 2021–22 season.

Key:

Boys tennis: 2006–2009, 2014, 2016-2017
Boys golf: 2003, 2007
Boys lacrosse: 2014
Girls golf: 2006, 2007, 2018
Volleyball:: 2005, 2007, 2008
Girls swimming: 2007
Girls cross country: 2013, 2014
Girls tennis: 2018
Northview also won the maiden championship of the Johns Creek Cricket Association

Accolades 

No. 2 in state for SAT scores (2018)

#2 Best Public High School In GA. (2018-2020);

Top 250 Public U.S. High Schools (2020);

Top 100 Best College Prep U.S. Public High Schools (2018, 2020) by Niche

U.S. News & World Report #5 Georgia High School (2019);

Top 250 U.S. High Schools (2019);

Top 100 High Schools (2012) Atlanta Magazine "Best High School" (2005- 2010, 2012)

Newsweek Magazine "Top 1,000 High School" (2005- 2010, 2012–2014);

America's Top High Schools (2016)

Governor's Cup Recipient 2004 and 2005

Notable alumni
 Jason Delay, baseball player
 Tyler Krieger, baseball player
 Reggie McClain, baseball player
 Ralph Sampson III, basketball player
 Justin Tuggle, football player
 Devon Werkheiser, actor

References

External links 
 Northview High School

Fulton County School System high schools
Johns Creek, Georgia